"Lassitude" is a song by British-based drum and bass record producers Sigma and DJ Fresh. It is the fourth and final single released from Fresh's second studio album Kryptonite. It reached number 98 on the UK Singles Chart and number 11 on the UK Dance Chart.

Music video
The music video for the song was uploaded to YouTube on 4 October 2010.

Track listings

Chart performance

Release history

References

2010 singles
2010 songs
DJ Fresh songs
Sigma songs
Song recordings produced by DJ Fresh
Songs written by DJ Fresh